This article lists compositions written for the viola.  The list includes works in which the viola is a featured instrument: viola solo, viola and piano, viola and orchestra, ensemble of violas, etc. Catalogue number, date of composition and publisher (for copyrighted works) are also included. Ordering is by composer surname.

This pages lists composers whose surname falls into the I to K alphabetic range.  For others, see respective pages:
 List of compositions for viola: A to B
 List of compositions for viola: C to E
 List of compositions for viola: F to H
 List of compositions for viola: L to N
 List of compositions for viola: O to R
 List of compositions for viola: S
 List of compositions for viola: T to Z

I
 Anthony Iannaccone (b. 1943)
     Remembrance for viola and piano (1968); Tritone Press
     Sonata for viola and piano (1961)
 Jacques Ibert (1890–1962)
     Aria for viola and piano (1930); original for voice and piano, published in various versions; transcription by Paul-Louis Neuberth; Éditions Alphonse Leduc
     Le petit âne blanc (The Little White Donkey) for viola and piano; original for piano; transcription by Alan H. Arnold; Éditions Alphonse Leduc
 Toshi Ichiyanagi (1933–2022)
     Duet for piano and string instrument (1961); C.F. Peters
 Airat Ichmouratov (b. 1973)
     Concerto No. 1 for viola and orchestra, Op. 7 (2004); Canadian Music Centre
     Concerto No. 2 "in Baroque Style" for viola and orchestra, Op. 41 (2015); Canadian Music Centre
     Fantasy on D. Shostakovich's Opera "Lady Macbeth of Mtsensk" for viola and orchestra, Op. 12 (2006)
     3 Romances for viola, string orchestra and harp, Op. 22 (2009); Canadian Music Centre
     Sonata for viola and piano, Op. 10 (2005)
 Akira Ifukube (1914–2006)
     La Fontaine sacrée (聖なる泉) for soprano, viola, bassoon and harp (1964, 2000); arrangement by the composer from the 1964 film score Mothra vs. Godzilla
      for soprano, viola and harp or piano (1992)
 Shin'ichirō Ikebe (b. 1943)
     Bivalence III for 2 violas (1999); Zen-On Music Company
     Emerald Colored Haze: In the Cold Morning (瑠璃色の靄 – 冷たい朝に) for ondes Martenot and viola (1997)
 Alexander Ilyinsky (1859–1920)
     Berceuse (Колыбельная песня) from Noure and Anitra (Нур и Анитра) for viola and piano, Op. 13 (1907); original for orchestra; transcription by Watson Forbes; Chester Music
 Kamran İnce (b. 1960)
     Road to Memphis for viola and harpsichord (2008)
 Vincent d'Indy (1851–1931)
     Choral varié for saxophone or viola and orchestra, Op. 55 (1903)
     Lied for cello or viola and orchestra, Op. 19 (1884)
 Richard Ingham (b. 1954)
     Nature Morte au Panier for viola solo (2009)
 Désiré-Émile Inghelbrecht (1880–1965)
     Impromptu in F minor for viola and piano (1922); Éditions Alphonse Leduc
     Nocturne for cello (or violin, or viola) and piano (1922); A.Z. Mathot
     Prélude et Saltarelle for viola and piano (1907); A.Z. Mathot
 Atli Ingólfsson (b. 1962)
     Annað sjálf álfsins (The Elves' Other Self) for viola solo (1994); Iceland Music Information Centre
 Pedro Ipuche-Riva (1924–1996)
     Sonata en re for viola and piano (1959–1961)
 Gabriel Iranyi (b. 1946)
     Hommage à György Kurtág, 3 Pieces for viola solo (1999)
     Sonata for violin or viola solo (2010–2011)
 John Ireland (1879–1962)
     The Holy Boy for viola and piano; transcription by Lionel Tertis (published 1918)
     Sonata in G minor for viola and piano (1923); original for cello and piano; transcription by Lionel Tertis (1941); Augener
 Yoshirō Irino (1921–1980)
     Suite (無伴奏ヴィオラのための組曲) for viola solo (1971)
 Regina Irman (b. 1957)
     Hügel bei Céret for 2 violas and double bass (1983); Musikedition Nepomuk Rupperswil; Édition Musicale Suisse
 Mark Isaacs (b. 1958)
     Night Songs for viola and piano (2004); Australian Music Centre
 Kan Ishii (1921–2009)
     Sonata for viola and piano (1962); Ongaku-no-tomo Edition
 Timur Ismagilov (b. 1982)
     Novella (Новелла) for viola solo, Op. 23 (2010)
     Fantasia (Фантазия) for viola and piano, Op. 46 (2019–2020)
 André Isoir (1935–2016)
     3 Pièces for viola and piano (2006); Editions Delatour
 Miloslav Ištvan (1928–1990)
     Canto No. 1 for viola solo (1978–1979); Český Hudební Fond
     Canto No. 2 for prepared violas and female voice (1980)
     Fantasie for clarinet, viola and piano (1949); Český Hudební Fond
     Mikrosvěty mého města (Micro-Worlds of My Town) for 2 violas, oboe and clarinet (1977); Český Hudební Fond
     Písně (Songs) for soprano, viola and piano (1949); Český Hudební Fond
     Ronda (Rondos) for viola and piano (1950); Editio Bärenreiter Praha; Český Hudební Fond
     Rotace a návraty (Rotations and Returns), 4 Movements for English horn, viola and cello (1988); Český Hudební Fond
 Jean Eichelberger Ivey (1923–2010)
     Aldébaran for viola and tape (1972); Carl Fischer
     Music for viola and piano (1976); Carl Fischer

J
 Gabriel Jackson (b. 1962)
     Lunae glaciales for piccolo (flute), viola and harp (1996, revised 1999)
 Gordon Jacob (1895–1984)
     Adagio and Allegro by Antonio Vivaldi; arrangement for viola and piano (1939) by Gordon Jacob
     Air and Dance for viola and piano (1957); Oxford University Press
     Concert Piece for viola and orchestra (1977); Corda Music Publications
     Concerto No. 1 in C minor (in One Movement) for viola and orchestra (1925, revised 1976); Boosey & Hawkes; Oxford University Press
     Concerto No. 2 in G major for viola and string orchestra (1979); Boosey & Hawkes
     Hearken Unto Me for soprano, viola and organ (1978)
     A Little Minuet for viola and piano (1972); in New Pieces for Viola, Book 1; Associated Board of the Royal Schools of Music
     Miniature Suite for clarinet and viola (1956); Breitkopf & Härtel; Musica Rara
     Nocturne for viola and cello (1959); Corda Music Publications
     Prelude, Passacaglia and Fugue for violin and viola (1948); Stainer & Bell
     Rigadoon for viola and piano (1972); in New Pieces for Viola, Book 1; Associated Board of the Royal Schools of Music
     Sonata No. 1 for viola and piano (1949); Anglo-American Music Publishers
     Sonata No. 2 for viola and piano (1978); Anglo-American Music Publishers
     Sonatina for 2 violas (1973); Oxford University Press
     Sonatina for viola or clarinet and piano (1946); Novello & Co.
     Suite for 8 violas (1976); Anglo-American Music Publishers
     Three Pieces (Elegy, Ostinato, Scherzo) for viola and piano (1930); J. Curwen & Sons
     Trio for clarinet, viola and piano (1969); Breitkopf & Härtel; Musica Rara
     Trotting Tune for viola and piano (1972); in New Pieces for Viola, Book 1; Associated Board of the Royal Schools of Music
     Variations for solo viola (1975); Breitkopf & Härtel; Musica Rara
     When Autumn Comes for viola and piano (1972); in New Pieces for Viola, Book 1; Associated Board of the Royal Schools of Music
 Frederick Jacobi (1891–1952)
     Fantasy for viola and piano (1941); Carl Fischer
     Penelope for viola and piano (1943); Independent Music Publishers
 Maurice Jacobson (1896–1976)
     Berceuse for viola and piano (1946); Oxford University Press
     Humoreske for viola and piano (1948); Alfred Lengnick
     Lament for viola and piano (1941)
     Salcey Lawn for viola and piano (1946); Augener
 Hanoch Jacoby (1909–1990)
     Concertino for viola and orchestra (1939); Israeli Music Institute
     King David's Lyre (כינור היה לדוד) for viola and piano (1948) or viola and string orchestra (1978); Israeli Music Institute
     Three Songs (שלושה שירים) for mezzo-soprano, viola and piano (1938); words by Rainer Maria Rilke; Israeli Music Institute
 Leoš Janáček (1854–1928)
     Říkadla (Nursery Rhymes) for voice(s), viola and piano; Universal Edition
 Nino Janjgava (b. 1964)
     E-flat and D-sharp (მი ბემოლი და რე დიეზი; Mi bémol et ré dièse; Es und Dis) for guitar and 6 violas, Op. 37 (2002)
 Karel Janovický (b. 1930) 
     Sonata for viola and piano, Op. 12 (1955); Český Hudební Fond
     Sonata for viola and piano (2008)
     Terzina for viola and piano (1978)
 Leopold Jansa (1795–1875)
     Cantilène for viola and piano, Op. 84 (1867); Laurentius-Musikverlag
     6 Duos for violin and viola, Op. 70 (1845)
 Pierre Jansen (1930–2015)
     3 Caractères (3 Characters) for viola and piano (2003); Editions Delatour
     Duo for violin and viola (2006); Editions Delatour
     Concerto for viola and chamber orchestra (1988); Éditions Salabert
 Robert Janssens (b. 1939)
     Ballade for viola and piano (2002); Fibonacci Publishing
     Mutatis mutandis for viola and piano (1991); Alain Van Kerckhoven Editeur
     Sonata for viola and piano; Éditions J. Maurer
 Émile Jaques-Dalcroze (1865–1950)
     Chant mélancholique et romance for violin (or viola) and piano, Op. 2 (1892)
     Larmes, Pièce lyrique for soprano, viola (or cello) and piano (1902)
 Armas Järnefelt (1869–1958)
     Kehtolaulu (Berceuse) for viola and piano (1904); original for orchestra
 Michael Jarrell (b. 1958)
     Assonance IV for tuba, viola and live electronics (1990); Éditions Henry Lemoine
     Émergences-Résurgences for viola and orchestra (2016); Éditions Henry Lemoine
     From the Leaves of Shadow for viola and orchestra (1991); Éditions Henry Lemoine
     ...more leaves... for viola, 5 instruments and electronics (2000); Éditions Henry Lemoine
     ...some leaves II... for viola solo (1998); Éditions Henry Lemoine
 Keith Jarrett (b. 1945)
     Bridge of Light for viola and orchestra (1990); Edition Schott
 Sándor Jemnitz (1890–1963)
     Duo-Sonata for viola and cello, Op. 25 (1927); Edition Schott
     Sonata for viola solo, Op. 46 (1941); Rózsavölgyi; Editio Musica Budapest
 Zoltán Jeney (1943–2019)
     Aritmíe – Ritmiche for flute, viola and cello (1967)
     A Leaf Falls: Brackets to e. e. cummings for violin or viola (with contact microphone) and prepared piano (1975); Editio Musica Budapest
 Joseph Willcox Jenkins (1928–2014)
     Sonata (in One Movement) No. 1 in D minor for viola and piano, Op. 7 (1950)
 Donald Martin Jenni (1937–2006)
     Musica dell'estate for viola alone (1974); Associated Music Publishers
 Willem Jeths (b. 1959)
     Capriccio for violin or viola solo (2009)
     Elegia for viola solo (2002); Donemus
     Meme for 2 violas and orchestra (2006); Donemus
 Ivan Jevtić (b. 1947)
     Grand Trio for violin, viola and piano (1992)
     Préludes for viola and piano (1987); Éditions Gérard Billaudot; United Music Publishers
     Soleil, soleil!! La nuit tombe... for 4 violas (1997)
     Sonata for viola solo (1996)
     Vers Byzance... (To Byzantium), Concerto for viola and string orchestra (1984); Éditions Gérard Billaudot; United Music Publishers
 Marta Jiráčková (b. 1932)
     Růžová pivoňka (The Pink Peony; Die Rosa Pfingstrose), Fantasie on the Painting by Bohumil Klimeš-Kozina for viola and piano, Op. 56 (2000); Český Hudební Fond
     Svatý Václave (Saint Wenceslas), Evocation of the Ancient Choral Manuscript for soprano, viola and piano, Op. 39 (1991); Český Hudební Fond
 Karel Boleslav Jirák (1891–1972)
     Smuteční hudba (Funeral Music) for viola and organ, Op. 58 (1946) for viola and orchestra (1962); Český Hudební Fond
     Sonata for viola and piano, Op. 26 (1925); N. Simrock, Leipzig
 Joseph Joachim (1831–1907)
     Drei Stücke (3 Pieces) for violin or viola and piano, Op. 2 (c.1848–1852)
       Romanze
       Fantasiestück
       Eine Frühlingsfantasie
     Hebräische Melodien, nach Eindrücken der Byron'schen Gesänge (Hebrew Melodies, after Impressions of Byron's Songs) for viola and piano, Op. 9 (1854–1855)
     Variationen über ein eigenes Thema (Variations on an Original Theme) in E major for viola and piano, Op. 10 (1854)
 Otto Joachim (1910–2010)
     Dialogue for viola and piano (1964); Canadian Music Centre
     Music for Violin and Viola (1953); Canadian Music Centre
     Petite œuvre for flute, viola and cello (2000); Canadian Music Centre
     Requiem for viola solo (1976); Canadian Music Centre
 Bertil Palmar Johansen (b. 1954)
     Capriccio for viola solo (1993); Music Information Centre Norway
 David Johnson (1942–2009)
     The Ballad of Thomas the Rhymer, Concerto for viola and chamber orchestra (1972); Scottish Music Centre
 Tom Johnson (b. 1939)
     Action Music IV for viola solo (1968); Two-Eighteen Press; Editions 75
     Tilework: Canon in Three Tempos (2:3:4) for viola solo (2003); Two-Eighteen Press; Editions 75
     Verses for viola solo (1976); Two-Eighteen Press
 Betsy Jolas (b. 1926)
     L'ardente for viola and piano (1978); Éditions Heugel
     Come Follow for bassoon and viola (2001)
     Episode sixième for viola solo (1984); Alphonse Leduc
     Frauenleben for viola and orchestra (1992); Éditions Billaudot
     Frauenliebe for viola and piano (2011)
     Music to Go for viola and cello (1995); Éditions Salabert
     Points d'aube for viola and 13 wind instruments (1968); Éditions Heugel
     Quatre Duos for viola and piano (1979); Éditions Heugel
     Remember for English horn or viola and cello (1971); Éditions Heugel
     Ruht wohl for viola and piano (2011)
 André Jolivet (1905–1974)
     Chant d'oppression for viola and piano (1935); Éditions Salabert
     Cinq églogues for viola solo (1967); Gérard Billaudot
     Petite suite for flute, viola and harp (1941); Éditions Musicales Transatlantiques
 Jens Joneleit (b. 1968)
     Sonata Semplice for viola solo, Op. 98 (1998); Alliance Publications
     Vers Divin for viola solo, Op. 91 (1995); Alliance Publications
 Charles Jones (1910–1997)
     Threemody for viola solo (1947)
     Triptychon for violin, viola and piano (1975)
 Daniel Jones (1912–1993)
     8 Pieces for viola and piano (1948)
     Sonata for viola and piano (1937)
     Suite: 6 Movements from a Twelve-tone Row for viola and cello (1949); Robert Lienau; C.F. Peters
 Matthew Jones (b. 1974)
     Fantasia on "My Welsh Home" for viola solo (2002)
 Robert W. Jones (1932–1997)
     Airs and Fancies, Some Pleasant Music for 2 violas
     Concerto for viola and orchestra (1984)
     A Joyful Noise for high voice and viola
     Sonata da chiesa (Words of Praise) for solo viola and mixed chorus
     Sonata for Worship No. 8 for viola and organ
     Sonatina for viola and piano
     Songs and Dances for viola and cello (1985); Latham Music
     Tower Sonatina for viola and piano
     Twogether for flute and viola (1989)
 Marinus De Jong (1891–1984)
     Blancifloer's klacht (Blancifloer's Complaint) for mezzo-soprano, viola and piano, Op. 70 (1947); CeBeDeM
     Concerto for viola and orchestra, Op. 111 (1958); CeBeDeM
     Epische Ballade "Mitsanoboe" for viola and piano, Op. 65 (1957); CeBeDeM
     Sonata for viola solo, Op. 106 (1973); Metropolis Music Publishers
 Joseph Jongen (1873–1953) 
     Adagio for violin and viola, Op. 22 No. 1 (1901); CeBeDeM
     Allegro Appassionato for viola and piano or orchestra, Op. 79 (1925); Masters Music
     Andante Espressivo for viola and piano (1900); CeBeDeM
     Andantino grazioso for viola and piano; CeBeDeM
     Carnaval for viola and orchestra
     Concertino for viola and piano, Op. 111 (1940); Éditions Max Eschig
     Introduction et Danse for viola and piano or orchestra, Op. 102 (1935); Éditions Max Eschig; Associated Music Publishers
     Lecture for double bass or viola (1927); CeBeDeM
     Prélude, variations et finale, Trio for violin, viola and piano, Op. 30 (1906–1907); Éditions Durand
     Suite in D major for viola and piano or orchestra, Op. 48 (1915); Henry Lemoine
 Léon Jongen (1884–1969)
     Aria for viola solo (1957); CeBeDeM
     Lecture for viola solo (1956); CeBeDeM
     Pastorale et gigue for viola and piano (1955); Éditions Musicale Brogneaux; CeBeDeM
 Mihail Jora (1891–1971)
     Sonata for viola and piano, Op. 32 (1956); Editura de Stat Pentru Literatură şi Artă, București
 Wilfred Josephs (1927–1997)
     Concerto for viola and small orchestra, Op. 131 (1983); Mornington Music; Novello & Co.
     Meditatio de Beommundo, Concertante for viola and small orchestra, Op. 30 (1960–1961); Edition Eulenburg; Josef Weinberger
 Christian Jost (b. 1963)
     Hamlet Echoes for voice, viola and piano (2008); Schott Music
     Mozarts 13097. Tag, Sinfonia Concertante for violin, viola and orchestra (2005); Schott Music
 Werner Josten (1885–1963)
     Sonata for cello (or viola, or clarinet) and piano (1938); Associated Music Publishers
 John Joubert (1927–2019)
     Four Images for oboe, viola and harp, Op. 149 (2003); Maecenas Music
     Six Miniatures after Kilvert for violin and viola, Op. 140 (1997); Novello & Co.
     Sonata for viola and piano, Op. 6 (1952); Novello & Co.
 Paul Juon (1872–1940)
     Divertimento in C major for clarinet and 2 violas, Op. 34 (1906); Robert Lienau; Edition Peters
     Romanze in F minor for viola (or cello) and piano (1898, 1899); adaptation from movement II of the Violin Sonata, Op. 7; Schlesinger
     Wiegenliedchen (Slumber Song) for viola and piano, Op. 38, No. 6 (1926); original for piano; Schlesinger, E.C. Schirmer
     Sonata in D major for viola and piano, Op. 15 (1901)
     Sonata in F minor for viola and piano, Op. 82a (1923)
 Liis Jürgens (b. 1983)
     Ämbliktektoonika (Spidertectonics) for viola solo (2007)

K
 Ričardas Kabelis (b. 1957)
     Dasonata for violin, viola and piano (1980)
     Ląstelė (Cell; Zelle) for violin, viola and piano (1992); Sema Edition; Lithuanian Music Information and Publishing Centre
     Syrtium for soprano, viola and bassoon (1985); words by Leonardas Gutauskas
     Schattenspiel for soprano and viola (1981); words by Leonardas Gutauskas
     Viola for viola and live electronics (1994)
 Pál Kadosa (1903–1983)
     Concertino for viola and orchestra, Op. 27 (1936); Editio Musica; Zeneműkiadó Vállalat, Budapest
 Jouni Kaipainen (1956–2015)
     Concerto for viola and orchestra, Op. 56 (1997); Edition Wilhelm Hansen
     Inno for viola and piano or harp, Op. 91g (2010–2013)
     Sonata for viola and piano or harp, Op. 91e/f (2010–2013)
 Viktor Kalabis (1923–2006)
     Sonata for viola and piano, Op. 84 (1997); Český Hudební Fond
     Tristium, Concerto Fantasia for viola and string orchestra, Op. 56 (1981); Český Hudební Fond
 Vakhtang Kakhidze (b. 1959)
     Brüderschaft (Брудершафт) for viola, piano and string orchestra (1996)
 Johannes Kalitzke (b. 1959)
     Flucht im Gewölbe (Escape the Vault), Spiral for solo viola and digital space simulation (1987)
     Labyrinth (Kafka-Komplex I), Spiral for solo viola and digital space simulation (1989); Boosey & Hawkes
     Trio infernal, Gespenstermechanik in 5 Kapiteln (Ghosts Mechanics in 5 Parts) for viola, cello and double bass (1985); Edition Gravis
 Jan Kalivoda (1801–1866)
     2 Duos for violin and viola, Op. 208 (1855)
     Fantaisie: Souvenir de Cherubini in F major for viola and piano, Op. 204 (1855)
     6 Nocturnes for viola and piano, Op. 186 (1851); published 1882
 Friedrich Kalkbrenner (1785–1849)
     Duos for violin, viola or cello and piano, Op. 11
     Grand Duo in D minor for flute (or cello, or viola, or violin) and piano, Op. 63 (c.1824)
 Sándor Kallós (b. 1935)
     3 Ricercari (Три ричеркара) for viola solo; Sovetsky Kompozitor
 Edvin Kallstenius (1881–1967)
     Cavatina for viola and chamber orchestra, Op. 30 (1943); STIM; Swedish Music Information Centre
     Visa (Canzone) from Dalarapsodi (Dalecarlia Rhapsody) for cello (or viola) and organ, Op. 18 (1931); original for orchestra; Eriks Musikandel och Förlag
 László Kalmár (1931–1995)
     Terzina for violin, viola and harp (1976); Editio Musica Budapest
 Heinrich Kaminski (1886–1946)
     Magnificat for solo soprano, solo viola, small off-stage chorus and orchestra (1925); Universal Edition
     Präludium und Fuge (Prelude and Fugue) in C major for viola solo (1931–1932); C.F. Peters
 Arthur Kampela (b. 1960)
     Bridges for solo viola (1994)
 Giya Kancheli (1935–2019)
     Abii Ne Viderem (Left In Order Not To See) for viola solo, piano, bass-guitar and string orchestra (1992); G. Schirmer
     Caris Mere for soprano and viola (1994); G. Schirmer
     Styx for viola, mixed choir and orchestra (1999); G. Schirmer
     Vom Winde Beweint (Mourned by the Wind), Liturgy for solo viola and orchestra (1989); G. Schirmer
 Sukhi Kang (1934–2020)
     Dialog for viola and piano (1978); Edition Modern, München
 Shigeru Kan-no (b. 1959)
     Concerto for viola and orchestra, WVE 236 (2006)
     Der Cid Suite for flute, viola and harp, WVE 181e (2001)
     Der Cid Suite for viola and piano, WVE 181j (2002)
     Four Elemente for clarinet, violin and viola, WVE 82 (1994)
     Iikangen-Trio for alto saxophone, viola and piano, WVE 261 (2008)
     Image for viola and piano, WVE 208e (2005)
     Kleines Stück (Little Piece) for 2 metal percussionists and 4 violas (1987, revised 1996)
     Kyosou for tenor saxophone and viola, WVE 80 (1994)
     Semi-Kyosou for bass saxophone and viola, WVE 80a (1994)
     Super Solo for viola solo, WVE 180d (2001)
 Jan Kapr (1914–1988)
     Fantasie for viola and piano (1937); Hudební Matice Umělecké Besedy
     String Quartet No. 8 for viola (as the main instrument), two violins and cello (1976); Panton
 Nikolai Kapustin (1937–2020)
     Sonata for viola and piano, Op. 69 (1992); Schott Music
     Sonatina for viola and piano, Op. 158 (2015); Schott Music
 Ivan Karabyts (1945–2002)
     Impromptu (Експромт) for viola and piano (1976)
     Valse (Вальс) for viola solo (1995); Duma Music
 Louis Karchin (b. 1951)
     Fantasy for violin or viola solo (1972); American Composers Alliance
     Viola Variations for viola and piano (1981); C.F. Peters
 Sigfrid Karg-Elert (1877–1933)
     Sonata No. 2 in B major for clarinet or viola and piano, Op. 139b (1919); Musikverlage Zimmermann
 Kjell Mørk Karlsen (b. 1947)
     Concerto for viola and string orchestra, Op. 159 (2007); Music Information Centre Norway
     Partita brevis over en norsk folketone for viola and organ (or piano), Op. 7 No. 5 (1993); Norsk Musikforlag
     Sonata Nova for viola and piano, Op. 101 (1992); Music Information Centre Norway
 Jurgis Karnavičius (1884–1941)
     Daina (Song) for voice and viola (published 1924); words by Percy Bysshe Shelley; Muzsektor gosudarstvennoe izdatelstva; Vaga, Vilnius
     Gluosnį linguoja (Swinging Willow) for voice and viola (1916); words by Konstantin Balmont; Lithuanian Music Information and Publishing Centre
     Serenada (Serenade) for voice and viola (1916); words by Afanasy Fet; Lithuanian Music Information and Publishing Centre
     To for voice and viola (published 1924); words by Percy Bysshe Shelley; Muzsektor gosudarstvennoe izdatelstva; Vaga, Vilnius
     Žiedlapėliai putokšlio (Milkwort Petals) for voice and viola (1916); words by Konstantin Balmont; Lithuanian Music Information and Publishing Centre
 Richard Karpen (b. 1957)
     Aperture for amplified viola and interactive electronics (2006)
     Solo/Tutti: Variations on an Irrational Number for amplified viola and real-time computer processing (2002)
 Laura Karpman (b. 1959)
     About Joshua for flute, viola and harp (2003); Fat Rock Inc.
     Common Tone for 5-string electric viola and electronics (2003); MMB Music
     ...For Viola and Piano (1983); MMB Music
     Rounds for viola and piano (2000); MMB Music
 Elena Kats-Chernin (b. 1957)
     For Alex No. 2 (Robyn's Request) for viola and piano (2004); Australian Music Centre
     Gypsy Ramble for viola, cello and piano (1996); Boosey & Hawkes; Australian Music Centre
     Still Life for viola and piano (2001); Boosey & Hawkes; Australian Music Centre
     Three Interludes for solo viola (2000, 2003); Boosey & Hawkes; Australian Music Centre
        Rag Interlude
        Tranquil Interlude
        Naive Interlude
 Dick Kattenburg (1919–1944)
     Allegro Moderato (Movement I of a Viola Sonata) for viola and piano (1944)
 Georg Katzer (1935–2019)
     Kette (Chain) for viola solo (1986); Deutscher Verlag für Musik
     Mi for flute, viola and harp (1987)
     Miteinander–Gegeneinander (Cooperation–Conflict), Duo concertante for English horn and viola (1982); Deutscher Verlag für Musik; Breitkopf & Härtel
     Wiedergänge (Recourses) for oboe, horn and viola (2003)
 Hugo Kauder (1888–1972)
     Kleine Suite (Little Suite) in A minor for viola solo (1924); Universal Edition; Seesaw Music
     Kleine Suite (Little Suite) for viola and piano (1939); Seesaw Music
     Serenade for flute, violin and viola (1947); Seesaw Music
     Sonata No. 1 in F major for viola and piano (1918); Seesaw Music
     Sonata No. 2 in G for viola and piano (1938); Seesaw Music
     Sonata No. 3 in D for viola and piano (1953); Seesaw Music
     Sonata No. 4 in D for viola and piano (1958); Seesaw Music
     Sonata for cello or viola and harp (1955); Seesaw Music
     Sonatina for cello or viola and piano (1953); Seesaw Music
     Suite No. 1 for flute, violin and viola (1971); Seesaw Music
     Suite No. 2 for flute, violin and viola (1972); Seesaw Music
     Trio for flute, violin and viola (1969); Seesaw Music
     Trio for oboe, viola and piano (1916); Universal Edition; Seesaw Music
     Trio for clarinet, viola and piano (1957); Seesaw Music
     Trio No. 1 for flute, oboe and viola (1936); Seesaw Music
     Trio No. 2 for flute, oboe and viola (1960); Seesaw Music
 Walter Kaufmann (1907–1984)
     Partita for viola solo
     Sonata for 3 violas (1980)
     Suite for 3 violas (c.1965)
 Masaru Kawasaki (1924–2018)
     La Preghiera (祈り Inori), Prayer Music No. 4 for viola solo (2006); Academia Music (アカデミア・ミュージック)
 Don Kay (b. 1933)
     Canzona I for flute and viola (1974); Australian Music Centre
     Canzona II for flute and viola (1972); Australian Music Centre
     Canzona III for flute and viola (1974); Australian Music Centre
     Cloud Patterns for solo viola (1988); Australian Music Centre
     Concert Music for viola and string orchestra (1973); Australian Music Centre
     Earth Forms for solo viola (1989); Australian Music Centre
 Ulysses Kay (1917–1995)
     Sonatina (in 1 Movement) for viola and piano, W2 (1939); American Composers Alliance
 Heinrich Ernst Kayser (1815–1888)
     Grand duo concertant in B major for clarinet (or violin) and viola, Op. 2
     Duo concertant for clarinet and viola, Op. 27 (1865)
     Nouvelle méthode d'alto (New Viola Method), Op. 54 (published c.1880)
 Minna Keal (1909–1999)
     Ballade in F minor for viola (or cello) and piano (1929); Corda Music Publications
 Nigel Keay (b. 1955)
     Adagietto Antique, Trio for clarinet, viola and piano (2009)
     Concerto for viola and orchestra (2000); Centre for New Zealand Music
     Double Jeu for 2 violas (2012); Centre for New Zealand Music
     Labyrinthe for flute and viola (2018) 
     Moderato à cent d'huîtres for viola and piano (2014); Centre for New Zealand Music
     Terrestrial Mirror for flute, viola and harp (2004)
     Visconti Variations, Duo for violin and viola (2008); Centre for New Zealand Music
 Andrew Keeling (b. 1955)
     Meditatio (Rosa) for solo viola, harp, cimbalom and string orchestra (1989, revised 1992)
     Off the Beaten Track for viola and prepared piano (1999)
 Milko Kelemen (1924–2018)
     Phantasmen for viola and orchestra (1985); Hans Sikorski
     Trois Danses (Three Dances) for viola and string orchestra (1957); London Universal Edition
 Homer Keller (1915–1996)
     Sonata for viola and piano (1951); American Composers Alliance
 Max E. Keller (b. 1947)
     Inseln for viola and cello (2002); Édition Musicale Suisse
     Kreisen in den Tiefen for viola, cello and double bass (1988); Édition Musicale Suisse
     Unione e tremolo for violin and viola (2002); Édition Musicale Suisse
 Robert Kelly (1916–2007)
     Concerto for viola and orchestra, Op. 53 (1976); American Composers Alliance
     Concerto for violin, viola and orchestra, Op. 57 (1980); American Composers Alliance
     Sonata for viola and piano, Op. 16 (1950); American Composers Alliance
     Suite for solo viola, Op. 28 (1955); transcription of the Cello Suite; American Composers Alliance
     Theme and Variations for violin, viola and piano, Op. 11 (1947); American Composers Alliance
     Three Expressions for violin and cello (or viola), Op. 49 (1971); American Composers Alliance
 Rudolf Kelterborn (1931–2021)
     Concerto for viola and orchestra (2009); Tre Media Musikverlage
     Duett for viola and contrabass clarinet (1989); Tre Media Musikverlage
     Kammermusik (Chamber Music) for flute, viola and piano (1957); Edition Modern
     Monodie II for flute, viola and harp (1977–1990); Hug Musikverlage
     Neun Momente (Nine Moments) for viola and piano (1973); Bote & Bock; Boosey & Hawkes
     Six Short Pieces for flute, viola and guitar (1984); Bote & Bock
 Wilhelm Kempff (1895–1991)
     Abendphantasie (Evening Fantasy) for voice, viola and organ, Op. 27 (1926); words by Hans Peter Eisenmann; Edition Walhall
 Tālivaldis Ķeniņš (1919–2008)
     Adagio and Fugue for viola, cello and organ (1985); Canadian Music Centre
     Canzona Sonata for solo viola and string orchestra (1986); Canadian Music Centre
     Concerto for viola and orchestra (1998)
     Elegy and Rondo for viola and piano (1979); Canadian Music Centre
     Fantasy-Variations on an Eskimo Lullaby for flute and viola (1967–1972); Canadian Music Centre
     Partita Breve for viola and piano (1971); Canadian Music Centre
     Sonata for viola and piano (1995); Canadian Music Centre
 Kent Wheeler Kennan (1913–2003)
     Nocturne for viola and orchestra (No. 2 of Three Pieces for orchestra) (1937); Eastman Rochester Archives; Prairie Dawg Press
 Oliver Kentish (b. 1954)
     Draumar og dansar (Dreams and Dances) for viola and chamber orchestra (2002); Íslenzk Tónverkamiðstöð
     Jakobslag, Little Duet for viola and marimba (1999); Íslenzk Tónverkamiðstöð
     Kvinnan fróma for viola and piano (2008); Íslenzk Tónverkamiðstöð
     Prelúdía og fúga (Prelude and Fugue) for 10 violas (2005); Íslenzk Tónverkamiðstöð
 Mihkel Kerem (b. 1981)
     Bullocks to That for viola solo (2014)
     Carmina Contrita for viola and cello (2020)
     Concerto for viola and orchestra (1994)
     Lament (Lamento) for cello or viola and string orchestra (2008, 2009); Fennica Gehrman
     Max's Spider for viola solo (2015)
     Nimetud lood (Nameless Pieces) for clarinet, viola and piano (2006)
     Sonata for viola and piano (2007)
 Aaron Jay Kernis (b. 1960)
     Concerto for viola and orchestra (2014); AJK Music
     Passacaglia-Variations for viola and piano (1985); Associated Music Publishers
 Louise Lincoln Kerr (1892–1977)
     Berceuse for viola and piano; Classic Unlimited Music
     Etude for violin and violin (1969); American Viola Society Publications
     Habañera for viola and piano; Classic Unlimited Music
     Lament for viola and piano; Classic Unlimited Music
     Las Fatigas del Querer (The Sorrows of Loving) for viola and piano; Classic Unlimited Music
     Orientale for violin and violin
     Toccata for viola and piano; Classic Unlimited Music
 Gordon Kerry (b. 1961)
     Antiphon for solo viola (2000); Australian Music Centre
     Caritas for viola and piano (2001); Australian Music Centre
     Concerto for viola and orchestra (1992); Australian Music Centre
     Etude for solo viola (1999); Australian Music Centre
     He Wishes for the Cloths of Heaven for mezzo-soprano and viola (1999); Australian Music Centre
     Nocturne for clarinet, viola and piano (2008); Australian Music Centre
     Parardi (Rain) for viola and piano (1988); Grevillea Editions
     Sinfonia for viola, cello and string orchestra (1993); Australian Music Centre
     Solitary Birds for 6 violas (2008); Australian Music Centre
 Willem Kersters (1929–1998)
     Sonata for viola and piano, Op. 6 (1954); CeBeDeM
 Aram Khachaturian (1903–1978)
     Sonata-Song (Соната-Песня) for viola solo (1976); Soviet Music; G. Schirmer
     Suite for viola and piano (1929); published 2011 in Khachaturian: Works for Viola and Piano and Viola Solo (Хачатурян: Произведения для альта и фортепиано и альта соло); Muzyka; Boosey & Hawkes
 Ivan Khandoshkin (1747–1804)
     Concerto in C major for viola and orchestra (1801); now thought to be written by Mikhail Goldstein; See musical hoax.
     Variations on the Russian Song "I Lost What I Loved" (Вариации на русскую песню "То теряю, что люблю") for viola and piano; transcription by Vadim Borisovsky (published 1955);  (State Music Publishing House)
 Quddus Khojamyarov (1918–1994)
     3 Pieces (Три пьесы) for viola and piano (1976); Sovetsky Kompozitor
 Michael Kibbe (b. 1945)
     Ariam Duo for viola and English horn or clarinet, Op. 123
     Duo Sonata for 2 violas, Op. 15
     Duo Sonata for viola and double bass, Op. 86 (1985)
     Lyric Duo for violin and viola or English horn, Op. 79 (1984)
     Malibu Music for violin and viola, Op. 113 (1991)
     Partita for viola solo, Op. 118
     Pastoral Trio for flute, viola or clarinet and bassoon, Op. 3 (1967); Seesaw Music Corporation
     Sonata for viola and piano, Op. 29 (1977)
     Trio for flute, viola and harp, Op. 99 (1989); Fatrock Ink
     Views of Atlantis for oboe, viola and piano, Op. 136 (2001)
 Friedrich Kiel (1821–1885)
     Sonata in G minor for viola and piano, Op. 67 (1870)
     3 Romanzen for viola and piano, Op. 69 (1871)
 Peter Kiesewetter (1945–2012)
     Bereshit (בראשית), Azione sacra for soprano, viola, zither, percussion and tape, Op. 70 (1995–1996)
     Sancti Francisci Laudes Creaturarum for soprano, viola and string orchestra (or organ), Op. 45 (1991); Klangmueller-Edition
     Shir (שיר) for viola solo, Op. 62 No. 1 (1990); Vierdreiunddreissig Musikverlag
     Shoshanim (שושנים) for viola and zither, Op. 61 No. 1 (1993); Vierdreiunddreissig Musikverlag
 Valeri Kikta (b. 1941)
     Concerto for viola and orchestra (1974)
     Nocturne (Ноктюрн) for flute, viola and harp (1979)
     Sonata for viola and harp (2001)
     Sonata for viola and harp (2002)
     Trio in Honor of M. N. Yermolova (Трио в честь М. Н. Ермоловой) for flute, viola and harp (1985)
 Wilhelm Killmayer (1927–2017)
     Die Schönheit des Morgens (The Beauty of Morning), 5 Romances for viola and piano (1994); Edition Schott
 Alastair King (b. 1967)
     Claire's Three Piece Suite for clarinet or viola (1997); Chester Music Ltd
 John Kinsella (1932–2021)
     Dialogue for viola solo (1991); Contemporary Music Centre Ireland
     Rhapsody on a Poem of Joseph Campbell for viola solo (1975); Contemporary Music Centre Irelan
 Theodor Kirchner (1823–1903)
     Acht Stücke (8 Pieces) for viola and piano, Op. 79 (1886); original for piano solo
 Volker David Kirchner (1942–2020)
     Nachtstück: Varianten über eine Wagnersche Akkordverbindung (Nocturne: Variants on a Wagnerian Chord Progression) for viola and chamber orchestra (1980–1981, revised 1983); Schott Music
     Schibboleth, Poème Concertante for viola and orchestra (1989); Schott Music
 Victor Kissine (b. 1953)
     Duo (after Osip Mandelstam) for viola and cello (1998); M.P. Belaieff
 Cyrill Kistler (1848–1907)
     Serenade in D minor for violin, or viola (viola alta), or cello and orchestra, Op. 72 (1903)
 Uuno Klami (1900–1961)
     Sonata in B minor for viola and piano, Op. 6 (1920); Fennica Gehrman
 Peter Klatzow (1945–2021) 
     Sonata In Memory of Oleg for viola solo (2009)
     The World of Paul Klee for flute, viola and harp (1972)
     The World of Paul Klee III for mezzo-soprano, flute, viola and harp (1972)
 Dmitri Klebanov (1907–1987)
     Concerto for viola and string orchestra (1983)
 Ståle Kleiberg (b. 1958)
     Concerto for viola and orchestra (2019–2020); Norsk Musikforlag
     Trio Luna for flute (alto flute), viola and harp (2016); Norsk Musikforlag
 Gideon Klein (1919–1945)
     Duo v systému čtvrttónovém (Duo in Quarter-tone System) for violin and viola (1939–1940); Bote & Bock; Boosey & Hawkes
     Preludium for viola solo (1940); Bote & Bock; Boosey & Hawkes
 Richard Rudolf Klein (1921–2011)
     Choral-Triptychon for viola and organ (1998); Edition P.J. Tonger
     Memorial for viola solo (1996); Edition P.J. Tonger
     Sonatina for viola and piano (1965); Möseler Verlag
 Paul Klengel (1854–1935)
     Drei Romanzen (3 Romances) for viola and piano, Op. 46 (1912)
     Sechs Stücke (6 Pieces) for viola and piano, Op. 39 (1910)
     Serenade for violin and viola, Op. 45 (1911)
     Vier Phantasiestücke (4 Fantasy Pieces) for viola and piano, Op. 48 (1912)
 John Klenner (1899–1955)
     Fantasia for viola and orchestra; Sprague-Coleman
 Karl Klingler (1879–1971)
     Phantasie-Sonate in C minor for viola solo (1953)
     Sonata in D minor for viola and piano (1909); N. Simrock
 Friedrich Klose (1862–1942)
     Elegie for violin or viola and piano, Op. 7 (1889)
 August Klughardt (1847–1902)
     Schilflieder (Songs of the Reeds), 5 Fantasy Pieces for oboe (or violin), viola and piano, Op. 28 (1872); after poems of Nikolaus Lenau
 Julia Klumpkey (1870–1961)
     Lullaby in F major for viola and piano (published 1937); Wesley Webster; American Viola Society Publications
     Quatre pièces (4 Pieces) for viola and piano (published 1932); Éditions M. Senart
     San Francisco Bay, Suite for viola and piano (published 1951); Wesley Webster
     Second Suite for viola and piano (published 1935); George Austin
 Jan Klusák (b. 1934)
     Monolog "Ubi vult" (Monologue "Ubi vult") for viola solo (1987)
     Partita for viola solo (1954)
     Rejdovák for bass clarinet, viola and double bass (1965); Český Hudební Fond
 Armin Knab (1881–1951)
     Rosa Mystica for alto and viola (1949); Edition Schott
 Adrian Knight (b. 1987)
     Livet Innanför Väggarna (Life inside Walls) for 2 violas, cello and double bass (2008–2009); Swedish Music Information Centre
 Edward Knight (b. 1961)
     Beneath a Cinnamon Moon for clarinet, viola and piano (2007); Subito Music
     Inbox for flute, viola and piano (2010); Subito Music
 Milan Knížák (b. 1940)
     Sonata for viola solo (2005); Český Hudební Fond
 Charles Knox (1929–2019)
     Music for Viola and Percussion (1989); C. Alan Publications
 Garth Knox (b. 1956)
     Fuga libre for viola solo (2008); Schott Music
     Jonah and the Whale for viola and tuba (2009)
     Ockeghem Fantasy for viola d'amore and 5 violas (2009)
     Viola Spaces, Contemporary Viola Studies for viola solo (2004, 2007); Schott Music
 Marcelo Koc (1918–2006)
     Concerto for viola and orchestra, Op. 35 (1986); audio link
     Concerto for viola and orchestra, Op. 40 (1989)
     Diálogos for viola and piano, Op. 31c (1979, 1980); original for violin and piano
 Erland von Koch (1910–2009)
     Concerto for viola and orchestra, Op. 33 (1946, revised 1966); STIM; Swedish Music Information Centre
     Larghetto for viola (or cello) and piano (1937, revised 1966); Peer Music Classical; Southern Music Publishing
     Lyrisk episod (Lyrical Episode) for viola and piano, Op. 29 (1944); STIM; Swedish Music Information Centre
     Monolog Nr. 16 (On a Swedish Folk Tune) for viola solo (1978); Carl Gehrmans Musikförlag
     Scherzo for viola (or cello) and piano (1937, revised 1966); Peer Music Classical; Southern Music Publishing
 Günter Kochan (1930–2009)
     Concerto for viola and orchestra (1973–1974); Verlag Neue Musik
     Sonata for viola and piano (1984–1985); Verlag Neue Musik
 Miklós Kocsár (1933–2019)
     Concerto lirico for viola and orchestra (2000); Editio Musica Budapest
     Duó-Szerenád (Duo Serenade) for violin and viola (1955)
     Hét változat mélyhegedűre (7 Variations) for viola solo (1983); Editio Musica Budapest
 František Kočvara (1730?–1791)
     3 Sonatas for viola with basso continuo, Op. 1 (published c.1780)
     4 Sonatas for viola with basso continuo, Op. 2 (published c.1775)
     Trio Sonata VI in C major for 2 violas with basso continuo (published c.1777)
 Zoltán Kodály (1882–1967)
     Adagio for violin or viola and piano (1905, revised 1916); transcription for viola and string orchestra by Imre Sulyok (1984); Editio Musica Budapest
     Szerenád (Serenade) for 2 violins and viola, Op. 12 (1919–1920); Universal Edition
 Charles Koechlin (1867–1950)
     Idylle for 2 clarinets or violin and viola, Op. 155b (1936); Le Chant du Monde
     Quatre petites pièces (4 Little Pieces) for horn, violin (or viola) and piano, Op. 32 (1894–1907); Éditions Max Eschig
     Sonata for viola and piano, Op. 53 (1911–1913); Editions Maurice Senart
 René Koering (b. 1940)
     Symphonie Concertante for violin, viola and string orchestra (2003); Éditions Salabert
 Hans von Koessler (1853–1926)
     Trio Suite for violin, viola and piano (c.1919); N. Simrock
 Jan Koetsier (1911–2006)
     Concertino for viola and orchestra, Op. 21 (1940, revised 1955); Heinrichshofen Verlag
     Concertino Drammatico for violin, viola and string orchestra, Op. 88 (1981); Donemus
     Duo Giocoso for trumpet (or oboe) and viola, Op. 69 (1979); Donemus
     Introduction and Variations on a Theme from the Opera "Die Zaubergeige" by Werner Egk for viola and piano, Op. 82 No. 3 (1978); Donemus
     Trio Romantico for viola, cello and piano, Op. 111 (1987); Donemus
 Ctirad Kohoutek (1929–2011)
     Panychida letní noci (Prayer for the Dead), Music in Two Sound Layers for viola, piano, percussion and tape (1968); Český Hudební Fond
     Suita romantica for viola and piano (1957); Český Hudební Fond
 Ellis Kohs (1916–2000)
     Burlesca II for clarinet, viola and horn (1945); American Composers Alliance
     Chamber Concerto for viola and string nonet (1949); Mercury Music
     Elegy and Credo for flute, viola and piano (1951–1952)
 Rezső Kókai (1906–1962)
     Verbunkos rapszódia (Verbunkos Rhapsody) for violin, or viola, or clarinet, and piano (1952); arrangement by Árpád Kígyósi; Editio Musica Budapest
 Barbara Kolb (b. 1939)
     Cavatina for violin or viola solo (1983, revised 1985); Boosey & Hawkes
     Related Characters for viola and piano (1982); Boosey & Hawkes
 Mikhail Kollontay (b. 1952)
     Concerto for viola and orchestra, Op. 8 (1979–1980)
     Sonata "Eight Psalms" (Восемь псалмов) for viola solo, Op. 7 (1977)
 Jō Kondō (b. 1947)
     Falling for 2 violas, double bass and electric piano (1973); University of York Music Press
     The Moor, Trio for viola, bassoon and piano (1982); University of York Music Press
     Res sonorae for oboe, viola and 12 instruments (1987); University of York Music Press
 Eva Noer Kondrup (b. 1964)
     Ulvemælk for viola and orchestra (2002); Edition Samfundet
 Štěpán Koníček (1928–2006)
     Eine kleine Trauermusik, Quarter-Tone Composition for viola solo (1980); Filmkunst Musikverlag
     Duo microtonale, Quarter-Tone Composition for viola and cello (1989); Filmkunst Musikverlag
 Servaes de Koninck (c.1654–c.1701)
     Sonata in D minor for viola and harpsichord (c.1700); Broekmans & Van Poppel
 Marek Kopelent (1932–2023)
     Toccata for viola and piano (1978); Breitkopf & Härtel
 Herman David Koppel (1908–1998)
     Concertino for violin, viola and cello soli with orchestra, Op. 110 (1983); Edition Samfundet
     Concerto for violin, viola and orchestra, Op. 43 (1947); Edition Wilhelm Hansen
     Divertimento pastorale for oboe, viola and cello, Op. 61 (1955); Edition Samfundet
     Patchwork for flute, viola and harp, Op. 106 (1981); Edition Samfundet
 Peter Paul Koprowski (b. 1947)
     Concerto for viola and orchestra (1995); Canadian Music Centre
 Mark Kopytman (1929–2011)
     Dedication (הקדשה) for viola solo (1986); Israeli Music Publications
     Cantus V (V קאנטוס), Concerto for viola and orchestra (1990); Israeli Music Publications
     Kaddish (קדיש) for viola and string orchestra (or piano) (1981); Israeli Music Publications
 Peter Jona Korn (1922–1998) 
     Duo for viola and piano, Op. 66 (1978, 1986); Filmkunst-Musikverlag; Edition Korn
 Egon Kornauth (1891–1959)
     Drei Stücke (Three Pieces) for viola and piano, Op. 47 (1954); Ludwig Doblinger
     Notturno (Andante) for viola and chamber orchestra, Op. 3b (1912); movement II from the Viola Sonata
     Sonata in C minor for viola and piano, Op. 3 (1912); Ludwig Doblinger
     Sonatine for viola and piano, Op. 46a (1952); Ludwig Doblinger
     Valse triste (from Trio-Suite, Op. 45) for viola and piano (1948); Ludwig Doblinger
 Nikolai Korndorf (1947–2001)
     Concerto for viola and string orchestra (1970)
     Sonata for viola solo (1970)
 Karl Korte (1928–2022)
     Viola Redux, Viola Dance for viola and piano (2000, revised 2006); K-note Press
 Tõnu Kõrvits (b. 1969)
     Chaconne for viola solo (2008)
 György Kósa (1897–1984)
     Az éj zsoltára (Psalm of the Night) for voice and viola (1964); words by Endre Ady; manuscript lost
     Duo for violin and viola (1943); Editio Musica Budapest
     Hat új miniatűr (Six New Miniatures) for viola and harp (1969)
     Megemlékezés... (In Memoriam...) for viola solo (1977); Editio Musica Budapest
     Istenes énekek (Sacred Songs) for tenor, baritone and viola (1936); words by Mihály Babits
     Szálkák (Splinters) for voice, viola and cello (1972); words by János Pilinszky
 Viktor Kosenko (1896–1938)
     Sonata for viola and piano (1928)
 Pekka Kostiainen (b. 1944)
     Sonatina for viola and piano (1980); Edition Fazer; Fennica Gehrman; Warner/Chappell Music Finland; Finnish Music Information Centre
 Péter Kőszeghy (b. 1971)
     ENTROPIE/beta for (amplified) viola and percussion (2005)
     Mirror for (amplified) viola and CD (2004–2009)
     Weibliche Hörbilder, 10 Aphorisms for alto voice and viola (2003)
 Boris Koutzen (1901–1966)
     Concerto for viola and orchestra (1949)
 Leo Kraft (1922–2014)
     Partita No. 2 for violin and viola (1961); Seesaw Music
 Heinz Kratochwil (1933–1995)
     Concerto for viola and chamber orchestra, Op. 67 (1970); Verlag Doblinger
     Sonata for viola and piano, Op. 21 (1961); Verlag Doblinger
     Spiegelungen (Reflections) for viola, cello and piano, Op. 120 (1980)
 Joseph Martin Kraus (1756–1792)
     Concerto in C major for viola and chamber orchestra, VB 153b; attributed to Roman Hoffstetter (1742–1815); Edition Schott
     Concerto in E major for viola and chamber orchestra, VB 153c (1785–1787); attributed to Roman Hoffstetter (1742–1815); Willy Müller, Süddeutscher Musikverlag
     Concerto in G major for viola and chamber orchestra with cello obbligato, VB 153a (1785–1787); attributed to Roman Hoffstetter (1742–1815); Möseler Verlag
     Sonata (Duo) in D major for flute and viola, VB 158 (1778); Amadeus Verlag; Musikverlage Zimmermann
 Veronika Krausas (b. 1963)
     Inside the Stone for viola solo (1997); Canadian Music Centre
 Jaroslav Krček (b. 1939)
     Hudba (Music) for viola and piano (1968)
     Hudba (Music) for viola, bassoon and piano (1977); Český Hudební Fond
 Alexander Krein (1883–1951)
     Prologue (Пролог) in F major for viola and piano, Op. 2 (1902–1911, 1927); Sovetsky Kompozitor; Universal Edition
 Ernst Krenek (1900–1991) 
     Sonata for viola solo, Op. 92 No. 3 (1942); Bomart Music Publications
     Sonata for viola and piano, Op. 117 (1948); Affiliated Musicians
     Sonatina for flute and viola, Op. 92 No. 2a (1942); Independent Music Publishers
     Sonatina for violin and viola (1921)
 Emil Kreuz (1867–1932)
     Concerto in C minor for viola and orchestra, Op. 20 (1885); Augener
     Der Violaspieler: Sammlung von progressiv geordneten Stücken für Viola und Klavier (The Viola Player: A Series of Progressive Pieces for Viola and Piano), Op. 13
          No. 1 – 12 Very Easy Pieces
          No. 2 – Progressive and Easy Pieces
          Nos. 3 & 4 – 20 Progressive Melodies
              Sketch; Augener
          No. 5 – 3 Easy Sketches
          No. 6 – Sonata in A minor; Amadeus Verlag
     4 Duos for violin and viola, Op. 39; Amadeus Verlag
     Frühlingsgedanken, 3 Pieces for viola and piano, Op. 9; Augener
     Liebesbilder (Pictures of Love), 3 Pieces for viola and piano, Op. 5 (1885); Amadeus Verlag
     Suite de pièces for viola and piano, Op. 45 (1897); Augener
     Trio in C major for violin, viola and piano, Op. 21 (published 1892); Augener
     Trio facile in C for violin, viola and piano, Op. 32; Amadeus Verlag
 Jaroslav Křička (1882–1969)
     Sonatina for violin and viola, Op. 48 (1926); Hudební Matice Praha
 Edino Krieger (1928–2022)
     Brasiliana for viola and piano (or string orchestra) (1983); L K Produções Artísticas, Rio de Janeiro; Academia Brasileira de Música
 Milan Křížek (1926–2018)
     Concerto grosso for violin, viola and orchestra (1989); Český Hudební Fond
     Diferencias for viola solo (2014)
     Koláž III (Collage III) for 2 violins and viola; Český Hudební Fond
     Lyrické fragmenty (Lyric Fragments) for mezzo-soprano, flute and viola (1990); Český Hudební Fond
     Sonata for viola solo (1994); Český Hudební Fond
 Karl Kroeger (b. 1932)
     Sonata for viola and piano (1951); American Composers Alliance
 Franz Krommer (1759–1831)
     13 Pieces for 2 clarinets and viola, Op. 47
     Sonata in D major for violin with viola accompaniment, Op. 27
     Sonata in A major for violin with viola accompaniment, Op. 29
     Sonata for violin with viola accompaniment, Op. 42
     Sonata in F major for viola, cello and piano, Op. 32 (1802); also seen as Op. 34
 Gail Kubik (1914–1984)
     Symphony Concertante for trumpet, viola, piano and orchestra (1952, revised 1953); Ricordi
 Ladislav Kubík (1946–2017)
     Sonata for viola solo (1978); Český Hudební Fond
 Augustin Kubizek (1918–2009)
     Concerto for viola and orchestra, Op. 48 (1980)
     Es liegt ein Schloß in Österreich, Variations for viola (or clarinet, or violin, or cello) and orchestra, Op. 43c (1982); Verlag Doblinger
     Kleine Suite (Little Suite) for violin and viola, Op. 5 No. 2 (1953); Verlag Doblinger
     Sonatine for viola (or clarinet or cello) and piano, Op. 5 No. 1 (1953); Verlag Doblinger
 Joseph Küffner (1776–1856)
     Concerto in A major for viola and orchestra, Op. 139 (1823)
     Divertissement in F major for horn or viola and piano, Op. 231 (1831)
     Potpourri in D major for viola and orchestra, Op. 57 (1816)
 Michael Kugel (b. 1946)
     Il Carnevale di Venezia for viola and piano (2001); Alain Van Kerckhoven Éditeur
     Classical Preludes for viola and piano (1999); Alain Van Kerckhoven Éditeur
     Sonata-Poem for viola solo (1987); Alain Van Kerckhoven Éditeur
     Suite in Memoriam Shostakovich for viola and piano (1988); Alain Van Kerckhoven Éditeur
 Claus Kühnl (b. 1957)
     Gewendete Figur for flute(s), viola and double bass (2003)
     Morceau '95 for viola and piano (1995); Friedrich Hofmeister Musikverlag
 Felicitas Kukuck (1914–2001)
     Aus tiefer Not schrei ich zu dir (1964); Hänssler-Verlag Stuttgart
        Partita for viola and organ (or piano)
        Geistliches Konzert (Sacred Concerto) for baritone, viola, organ and chorus
     Der 6. Psalm (Psalm 6), Cantata for tenor and viola (1991)
     Der 13. Psalm (Psalm 13), Cantata for tenor and viola (1991)
     Die Tänze der Mirjam (The Dances of Miriam), 10 Dances for viola solo (1988); Furore Edition
     Fantasie for viola and piano (1951); Möseler Verlag; Schott Music
     Volkslieder-Variationen (Folk Song Variations) for viola and piano (1942)
     Zaubersprüche, Cantata  for female voice, viola and piano (c.1955)
 Hanna Kulenty (b. 1961)
     A Fourth Circle for viola (or violin, or cello) and piano (1994); Donemus
 Gary Kulesha (b. 1954)
     "...and dark time flowed by her like a river..." for viola (or violin, or cello) and piano (1993); Canadian Music Centre
     Concerto for viola and chamber orchestra (1992)
 Friedrich August Kummer (1797–1879)
     Fantaisie sur les motifs de l'opéra "Lucia di Lammermoor" de G. Donizetti for cello or viola and piano, Op. 68 (1841)
 Kaspar Kummer (1795–1870)
     Trio in C major for flute, viola (or violin) and piano, Op. 75 (1832)
     Sérénade in D major for flute, viola (or violin) and guitar, Op. 81 (1835)
     Sérénade in C major for flute, viola (or violin) and guitar, Op. 83 (1835)
 Pierre Kunc (1865–1941)
     Rapsodie for viola and piano (1940); Éditions Max Eschig
     Sonata in B minor for viola and piano (or orchestra) (1919–1921); Buffet-Crampon
 Luigi von Kunits (1870–1931)
     Sonata for viola and piano (1917)
 Meyer Kupferman (1926–2003)
     Among the Windy Places for violin, viola and bassoon (1994); Soundspells Productions
     Aspen Duo for trumpet and viola (1982); Soundspells Productions; Subito Music
     Concerto for Six Instruments (flute, oboe, horn, violin, viola and cello) and Orchestra (1978)
     Duo Arsenalas for flute and viola (1996)
     Icarus for viola, cello and guitar (1976)
     Ich Bin der Eine for speaker and viola (1984); words by Stefan George
     Image I for clarinet and viola (1984); Soundspells Productions
     Image II for clarinet and viola (1985); Soundspells Productions
     Image of the Third Garden for clarinet and viola (1986); Soundspells Productions
     Infinities No. 2 for viola solo
     A Little Bit for clarinet and viola (1988); Soundspells Productions
     Little Fantasy for viola and piano (1980); General Music Publushing
     Phantom Episodes for clarinet and viola (1989); Soundspells Productions
     Phantom Sonata for viola and piano (1979); Soundspells Productions
     Poetics No. 6 for clarinet, viola and piano (1983)
     Quiet Play for viola and piano (1987); Soundspells Productions; Subito Music
     Romanza d'Amore for viola and double bass (1986); Soundspells Productions
     Serenade for guitar and viola (1995); Soundspells Productions
     Sound Objects No. 8 for clarinet, viola and double bass (1978)
     Sound Phantoms No. 1 "On Beauty and the Beast" for viola and piano (1979)
     Two for One for viola solo (1990); Soundspells Productions; Subito Music
 Giedrius Kuprevičius (b. 1944)
     Pirmieji šeši žodžiai arba viskas iš vandens (The Six First Words or All from Aquatic) for flute, viola and piano (2006)
     Maži pokalbiai (Small Conversations) for violin and viola (1994); Lithuanian Music Information and Publishing Centre
 György Kurtág (b. 1926)
     ...Concertante... for violin solo, viola solo and orchestra, Op. 42 (2003); winner of the 2006 Grawemeyer Award for Music Composition; Editio Musica Budapest
     Concerto for viola and orchestra (1954); Editio Musica Budapest
     Hommage à R. Sch. for clarinet (also bass drum), viola and piano, Op. 15d (1990); Editio Musica Budapest
     Jelek (Signs) for viola, Op. 5 (1961; revised 1992); Editio Musica Budapest
     Jelek, játékok és üzenetek (Signs, Games and Messages) for viola solo (1961, 1987, 1992–2001; revised 1991–2005); Editio Musica Budapest
     Jelek, játékok és üzenetek (Signs, Games and Messages) for string duo (2 violas; viola and violin, or cello, or double bass) (1983, 1986, 1990–2006; revised 1991, 1993, 2003); Editio Musica Budapest
     Tétel (Movement) for viola and orchestra (1953–1954); Editio Musica Budapest
 Bronius Kutavičius (1932–2021)
     Ant kranto (On the Shore) for soprano and 4 violas (1972); words by Jonas Mekas; Vaga, Vilnius; Lithuanian Music Information and Publishing Centre
     Sonata for viola and piano (1968); Sovetsky Kompozitor; Edition Peters
 Mati Kuulberg (1947–2001)
     Viis eesti rahvaviisi (Five Estonian Folk Tunes; Fünf estnische Volksweisen) for clarinet, viola and double bass (1969, 1988); Bella Musica; Antes Edition; Edition 49
 Vyacheslav Kuznetsov (b. 1955)
     Capriccio (Капрыччио) for viola solo (1988)
     Heterophony (Гетэрафонія) for oboe, violin and viola (1993)
 Johan Kvandal (1919–1999)
     Elegi og Capriccio (Elegy and Capriccio) for viola solo, Op. 47 (1977); Norsk Musikforlag
     Sonata "Elgsonaten" (The Elk Sonata) for viola and piano, Op. 81 (1995); Norsk Musikforlag
 Jaroslav Kvapil (1892–1958)
     Duo for violin and viola (1949)
     Suita (Suite) for viola and chamber orchestra (1955); Český Hudební Fond
 Otomar Kvěch (1950–2018)
     Haiku o Praze (Haiku of Prague), Melodrama for recitor and viola (or violin) (2007); words by Karel Trinkewitz
     Missa con Viola Obligata for mixed chorus, viola solo, percussion and organ (1998)
     Sonata for viola and piano (1989); Český Hudební Fond
 Yannis Kyriakides (b. 1969)
     Four Maggots for viola and double bass (1992)

References

External links
 Free scores featuring the viola at the International Music Score Library Project

 
Viola I-K